"Ah" is a song by Japanese J-pop and rock band Superfly. "Ah" was initially released as the final track on their third studio album Mind Travel. On June 14, 2011, before the release of the album, Superfly released a statement that "Ah" would be released as the album's 4th single and as the band's 13th single overall. This version, titled in Japanese as "" (Aa), would feature lyrics, instead of the album version's a cappella chanting, and would be sold as a one-track single. The label wanted to release the version with lyrics as part of Mind Travel, but Shiho Ochi decided that the version without lyrics would be on the album but they would release the lyric version at a later date. Regarding the song, Ochi stated that the album version of the song is meant to show that one does not need words to convey emotions to others. In addition, a short film consisting of a total solar eclipse that uses "Ah" as its soundtrack will be shown at the Short Shorts Film Festival & Asia 2011 on June 16, 2011. The "Aa" version peaked at number 9 on the Oricon Weekly Charts.

Track listing

Personnel

Personnel details were sourced from the liner notes booklet of Mind Travel.

Aico – background vocal 
Mika Arisaka – background vocal
Can'no – background vocal
Luz Fonte – background vocal
Binkoh Izawa – background vocal
Jon Kasagi – background vocal
Junear – background vocal
Frances Maya – background vocal
Miku Nakamura – background vocal
Shiho Ochi – lead and background vocal
Haruko Ōhinata – background vocal
Rung Hyang – background vocal
San (Chagra) – background vocal
Tama (Chagra) – background vocal
Hiroko Satoh – background vocal
Masayuki Shioda – background vocal
Kaori Sawada – background vocal
Kenichi Takemoto – background vocal
Maiko Takeshita – background vocal
Mayuka Tanaka – background vocal 
Yukiko Tanaka – background vocal
Kōichi Tsutaya – piano, programming
Yūho Yoshioka – background vocal

References

External links
"Ah" at Superfly-Web.com

2011 singles
2011 songs
Japanese-language songs
Superfly (band) songs
Warner Music Japan singles